Qajymuqan Munaitpasuly (Qajymūqan Mūñaitpasūly; , 'Khadzhimukan Munajtpasov' 7 April 1871 – 12 August 1948), also known as Hadjimukan Munaytpasov, was a Kazakh wrestler and repeated World Champion in Greco-Roman wrestling.

Qajymuqan Munaytpasuly was born in 1871, in Karaotkyel village in Akmola Province, Russian Empire. He was 194 cm tall and weighed 139 kg. He fought in 54 countries, winning 48 medals. One of the most important moments in his career was in 1910, when he was awarded the gold medal in Buenos Aires and became World Champion in Gothenburg in Sweden for the first time. This was the first time in history that a Kazakh won a world championship.
One of his famous victories was the defeat of Japanese jiu-jitsu master Harakiki Jindofu, who did not survive the fatal injury of the spine he received during the fight.
Several times he was not allowed to be in the Russian National team due to the Russian Empire's discriminatory policy, therefore he participated in international competitions on behalf of Manchuria with the Japanese name Yamagata Makhanura.

In addition to being famous because of his wrestling career, he was also a patriot for his country. He had good connections to people in the Alash Party and met with them in 1918 in Omsk. After the Civil War he founded the first Kazakh theater in Kyzylorda in 1925. Before retiring from his wrestling career in 1940, he collected over 100.000 rubles for the USSR Defense Fund by showing his strength and tricks in a small circus tent to the public during the Second World War. This money was used to buy a Po-2 plane for the Soviet army. Munaytpasov wrote a telegram to Stalin requesting that the plane be named after the legendary Kazakh-Soviet fighter Amangeldy Imanov, to which Stalin obliged.

He died on 12 August 1948 in Lyeninskoe znamya kolkhoz (South Kazakhstan Province), without any disciples and learners and leaving his four wives in Turkestan. In 1980 a museum was opened in his honor in the village Temirlan (Temirlanovka) around 20 kilometers north of Shymkent. There are also Qajymuqan's streets in Almaty, Nur-Sultan and Semey. The soccer stadium in Shymkent - the home of FC Ordabassy - is named after him. In front of the stadium is also a statue for him, too. Two Russian films were based on his life's history: Haji-Mukan (1978) and Know ours! (1985; starring Bakhytjan Esjanov, Gyeorgiy Khachaturovich and Aleksandr Pankratov-Chorny).

External links

 Article about him in English
 Article in Kazakh

Ethnic Kazakh people
1871 births
1948 deaths